Łączki  is a village in the administrative district of Gmina Sierakowice, within Kartuzy County, Pomeranian Voivodeship, in northern Poland. It has a population of 60.

History

The village has been a part of German Empire. Its German name, Lonsk, was deemed sounding too Kashubian, and changed to Lohns in 1907.

References

Villages in Kartuzy County